HL-2 may refer to:

 Half-Life 2, a computer game by Valve
 Medwecki HL 2 "Haroldek" - a 1927 Polish one-off light aircraft, built by Jozef Medwecki.